Arctosaurus is an extinct genus of archosauromorph, possibly an allokotosaurian, but was often classified as a sauropodomorph dinosaur between 1900 and 1976. Although it has also been classified as a theropod, recent review finds that the similarities it shares with theropods are spread throughout several groups of Late Triassic reptiles, and so it cannot be assigned any more specifically than to Archosauriformes. Other authors have suggested trilophosaurian affinities.

Discovery and naming 
It is based on holotype NMING: F14878, a neck vertebra that was found in 1859 by Captain Sherard Osborn on Cameron Island, Nunavut, Canada, in Late Triassic-age rocks of the Heiberg Formation. In 2016, the material of Arctosaurus osborni was redescribed. The name Arctosaurus means "arctic lizard" in reference to the latitude where the holotype was discovered.

References 

Allokotosaurs
Late Triassic reptiles of North America
Carnian genera
Triassic Canada
Fossils of Canada
Paleontology in Nunavut
Fossil taxa described in 1875
Prehistoric reptile genera